Museum Angkut (in English as Transportation Museum) is a transport museum located in Batu, East Java, Indonesia and located on hillside of Mount Panderman, part of Mount Kawi-Butak. The museum has more than 300 collections of types of traditional to modern transportation. The museum is divided into several zones decorated with the background of building models from the continents of Asia, Europe to America. Especially in the European Zone, its setting by 1800-1900s French-style with various vintage European cars. Museum Angkut is the first all type and mode of transportation museum in Indonesia and Southeast Asia.

In addition to vintage cars, one of the newest transport collections is the Tucuxi electric car owned by former Indonesian minister of BUMN and owner of Jawa Pos Group, Dahlan Iskan who had previously had an accident on a road located on the slopes of Mount Lawu in Magetan when tested. In the museum, there is also a Flight Simulator vehicle located on the third floor of the main museum building.

Museum Angkut is owned and operated by Jawa Timur Park Group which also has Batu Secret Zoo, Batu Night Spectacular (BNS), Eco Green Park and Wildlife Museum. The museum was founded on 9 March 2014.

Gallery

See also 

 Jawa Timur Park
 List of transport museums

References

External links 

 Official website of Museum Angkut

Batu, East Java
Tourist attractions in East Java
Museums in East Java
Transport museums in Indonesia
Museums established in 2014
2014 establishments in Indonesia
Transport museums
Automotive museums